Sanskriti the Gurukul is a day boarding school on the outskirts of Guwahati, in the Indian state of Assam. The school follows the ICSE and ISC curriculum and was inaugurated by S.K. Sinha as North-East India's first day boarding school. It was established based on  the ideas of Asutosh Aggarwal. In 2015, the school was awarded “India’s most influential brand” by ASIA ONE MAGAZINE. As of 2018, it is widely considered as the best co-curricular day boarding school in India.

References

External links
Official website

Schools in Guwahati
Educational institutions established in 2003
2003 establishments in Assam